Cédric Gracia (born 23 March 1978 in Pau, France) is a French mountain biker, who now lives in Andorra.

Career
He started his career as an athlete at 6 years old as a BMX rider and then a freestyle ski pro. Cedric Gracia, years later, became a mountain bike rider. He entered the professional mountain biking scene in 2001, then part of the Volvo/Cannondale team.

He races in downhill and four-cross (4X) on the UCI World circuit. Gracia rode for the Rainer-Wurz Siemens Cannondale team between 1999 and 2005, before joining the Commencal team in 2006. In 2003 Cedric won the Red Bull Rampage, a big-mountain freeride competition in Utah.

In 2008 he took part as a guest editor for the 20th anniversary issue of Mountain Biking UK (MBUK) magazine. In 2008, he also participated in the new Red Bull Rampage: Evolution. In addition, he recently won the Crankworx 4X competition. He also recently won the Urban Race in Brazil, Paris, Chile.

In 2010 Gracia started his own team, the CG Racing Brigade. During 2010 he was the only rider on the team but in 2011 Marcelo Guttierez, the Colombian National Champion, was added to the ranks. They are two of very few riders outside the Santa Cruz Syndicate to be using the carbon V-10 downhill bike during the 2011 season.

In 2012 Gracia had a major crash during practice at the Val Di Sole (Italy) race of the World Cup, and “almost died twice” in the days following.

In 2013, at the Vallnord race of the World Cup, Gracia announced his retirement from World Cup downhill racing to focus on “movie parts with big jumps” and Enduro racing.

References

External links
Cedric's Rider Profile on Santa Cruz's website
Cedric's Profile on O'Neal's website
Cedric Gracia official website

Furious Agency - Cedric's sport marketing agency

CG on Facebook
Commencal Fan Twitter Page

1978 births
Living people
French male cyclists
Four-cross mountain bikers
Downhill mountain bikers
Sportspeople from Pau, Pyrénées-Atlantiques
Freeride mountain bikers
French mountain bikers
Cyclists from Nouvelle-Aquitaine